Modern High School & Jr. College is located in Akole, Maharashtra. It is operated by Hind Seva Mandal, Ahmednagar (HSM), is the first high school in Akole city. It is also known as Modern High School & Junior College of Arts, Commerce and Bhaskarrao Kadam (Guruji) Science, Akole. Dnyanwardhini Prathamik Shala, Modern Junior College are the faculties for primary education & higher secondary education respectively. Balak Mandir is another faculty for pre-primary education.

Its primary languages of instruction are semi-English and Marathi. In addition to academics, the school offers a wide range of co-curricular activities in kabaddi, Kho kho, yoga, Weekly Quiz, shot put, basketball, Rope gymnast pole, drama, debates and elocution. "Teacher's Day" is celebrated every year in MHSA.

Each year, students take part in Voting events like those in the election for MLA. It plays an important part for students to experience democracy. It helps students to solve their queries by an elected head. Every student of school should vote for a Class Representative (C.R.) for individual class and  General Secretary (G.S.) for the whole school and a Ladies Representative (L.R.) for girls.

The school has implemented continuous and comprehensive evaluation (CCE). The school is maintaining children's record as per RTE. The school has a boundary wall. Teachers have graduate and above degrees. The school is inspected annually and once visited by the CRC Coordinator. The school provides a mid-day meal.

History

Akole Taluka was known as remote, hilly and tribal city. In this area with the intention of education progress, Hind Seva Mandal has founded first Secondary High School on 1 March 1951 on the bank of holy Pravara river. Education's continuous flow of knowledge is running since 65 years in form of Modern High School. MHSA is the oldest high school in Akole Village since 1951. First MHSA was Very small and has a just one teacher, principal, peon named late Mr. Anantrao Dattatray Deshpande. When students had to go to the city for further education in the mid-1970s, he realised this need, HSM started Jr. College attached to high school in 1975. This Jr. College was the first Science's Jr. College in Akole. HSM started science faculty and got a great response. So many parents forced for starting Commerce & Arts faculty and HSM started Commerce faculty in 1999 and Arts in 2007.

MHSA has an IT section. Jr. College is connected with secondary school and has a special discipline.

MHSA has laboratories, a large library, and much sports equipment. The school aims for the students' all-round development.

Features

 Four science laboratories                      
 Five big playgrounds                                             
 Two computer rooms                                        
 A digital classroom                                     
 Auditorium Boob Rangmanch                            
 Nearly 40 classrooms                                     
 Library                                              
 Art zone
 Gymnasium
 NCC, NSS and the Camps
 Sports equipment
 Badminton and volleyball courts
 Indoor games

Activities

 Bal Sanskar Warg
 Speeches of famous persons
 Prize distribution ceremony and gathering
 Harit sena
 Celebration of great people's birth and death anniversaries
 Festivals
 Gymnastics
 Trips including aeroplanes and ships
 Speeches and debates
 Sports events
 Drama production
 Yoga practices 
 Environment protection
 Former students' Melava

Achievements

 Nearly 50 Boys & 50 Girls selected in Defense Service
 12th Arts Result March 2015 – 94%
 12th Science Result March 2015 – 97%
 12th Commerce Result March 2015 – 100%
 National and International level selection for sports
 10th Semi English Result -100%

Ahmednagar district
High schools and secondary schools in Maharashtra